Potanthus niobe is a species of skipper butterflies endemic to the Philippines. It contains two subspecies:

Potanthus niobe niobe (Evans, 1934) - found in Mindanao. Underside of hindwing is dark brown with an overshadowing of yellow scales. The discal spots are yellow with dark veins.
Potanthus niobe hyugai de Jong & Treadaway, 1993 - found in Visayas and Luzon. Underside of hindwing is a warm reddish brown with orange-yellow discal spots and the veins outlined in a lighter shade.

References

Potanthus
Butterflies described in 1934